is a town located in Nishimorokata District, Miyazaki Prefecture, Japan.

As of October 1, 2020, the town has a population of 8,646 and the population density of 101.3 persons per km². The total area is 85.39 km².

Geography

Surrounding municipalities 
 Miyazaki Prefecture
 Kobayashi
 Miyakonojō
 Kagoshima Prefecture
 Kirishima

Demographics 
Per Japanese census data, the population of Takaharu has declined in recent decades.

Transportation

Railway
 JR Kyushu - Kitto Line
 Hirowara - Takaharu

Highways
 Higashikyushu Expressway
 Japan National Route 221
 Japan National Route 223

References

External links

Takaharu official website 

Towns in Miyazaki Prefecture